Anteater is a common name for the four extant mammal species of the suborder Vermilingua (meaning "worm tongue") commonly known for eating ants and termites. The individual species have other names in English and other languages. Together with the sloths, they are within the order Pilosa. The name "anteater" is also commonly applied to the unrelated aardvark, numbat, echidnas, pangolins, and some members of the Oecobiidae, although they are not closely related to them.

Taxonomy

Classification

The anteaters are more closely related to the sloths than they are to any other group of mammals. Their next closest relations are armadillos. There are four extant species in three genera: 
 Giant anteater (Myrmecophaga tridactyla)
 Silky anteater (Cyclopes didactylus)
 Northern (Tamandua mexicana) and southern tamandua (Tamandua tetradactyla)
There are several extinct genera as well.

Order Pilosa
Suborder Folivora (sloths)
Suborder Vermilingua (anteaters)
Family Cyclopedidae
Genus Cyclopes
Silky anteater (C. didactylus)
Genus †Palaeomyrmidon (Rovereto 1914)
Family Myrmecophagidae
Genus Myrmecophaga
Giant anteater (M. tridactyla)
Genus †Neotamandua (Rovereto 1914)
Genus Tamandua
Northern tamandua (T. mexicana)
Southern tamandua (T. tetradactyla)
Genus †Protamandua (Ameghino 1904)
 Incertae sedis
 Genus †Argyromanis (Ameghino, 1904)
 †Argyromanis patagonica
 Genus †Orthoarthrus (Ameghino, 1904)
 †Orthoarthrus mixtus

Evolution
Anteaters are part of the Xenarthra superorder, a once diverse group of mammals that occupied South America while it was geographically isolated from the invasion of animals from North America, with the other two remaining animals in the family being the sloths and the armadillos.

At one time, anteaters were assumed to be related to aardvarks and pangolins because of their physical similarities to those animals, but these similarities have since been determined to be not a sign of a common ancestor, but of convergent evolution. All have evolved powerful digging forearms, long tongues, and toothless, tube-like snouts to subsist by raiding termite mounds. This similarity is the reason aardvarks are also commonly called "anteaters"; the pangolin has been called the "scaly anteater"; and the word "antbear" is a common term for both the aardvark and the giant anteater.

Physical characteristics

All anteaters have elongated snouts equipped with a thin tongue that can be extended to a length greater than the length of the head; their tube-shaped mouths have lips but no teeth. They use their large, curved foreclaws to tear open ant and termite mounds and for defense, while their dense and long fur protects them from attacks from the insects. All species except the giant anteater have a long prehensile tail.

Behaviour

Anteaters are mostly solitary mammals prepared to defend their 1.0- to 1.5-mi2 (2.6- to 3.9-km2) territories. They do not normally enter a territory of another anteater of the same sex, but males often enter the territory of associated females. When a territorial dispute occurs, they vocalize, swat, and can sometimes sit on or even ride the back of their opponents.

Anteaters have poor sight but an excellent sense of smell, and most species depend on the latter for foraging, feeding, and defence. Their hearing is thought to be good.

Its daily energy intake from food is only slightly greater than its energy need for daily activities, and anteaters probably coordinate their body temperatures so they keep cool during periods of rest, and heat up during foraging.. In addition to this, anteaters typically forage at night using their keen sense of smell to locate ants.

Reproduction
Adult males are slightly larger and more muscular than females, and have wider heads and necks. Visual sex determination can, however, be difficult, since the penis and testes are located internally between the rectum and urinary bladder in males and females have a single pair of mammae near the armpits. Fertilization occurs by contact transfer without intromission, similar to some lizards. Polygynous mating usually results in a single offspring; twins are possible but rare. The large foreclaws prevent mothers from grasping their newborns and they therefore have to carry the offspring until they are self-sufficient.

Feeding
Anteaters are specialized to feed on small insects, with each anteater species having its own insect preferences: small species are specialized on arboreal insects living on small branches, while large species can penetrate the hard covering of the nests of terrestrial insects. To avoid the jaws, sting, and other defences of the invertebrates, anteaters have adopted the feeding strategy of licking up large numbers of ants and termites as quickly as possible — an anteater normally spends about a minute at a nest before moving on to another — and a giant anteater has to visit up to 200 nests per day to consume the thousands of insects it needs to satisfy its caloric requirements.

The anteater's tongue is covered with thousands of tiny hooks called filiform papillae which are used to hold the insects together with large amounts of saliva. Swallowing and the movement of the tongue are aided by side-to-side movements of the jaws. The tongue is attached to the sternum and moves very quickly, flicking 150 times per minute. The anteater's stomach, similar to a bird's gizzard, has hardened folds and uses strong contractions to grind the insects, a digestive process assisted by small amounts of ingested sand and dirt.

Distribution

Range
Silky anteaters and northern tamanduas extend their ranges as far north as southeastern Mexico, while giant anteaters can be found as far north as Central America. Southern tamanduas range south to Uruguay (giant anteaters did also until their recent extirpation there) and the ranges of all species except the northern tamandua overlap in eastern Brazil. Anteaters were confined to South America, which was formerly an island continent, during most of the Cenozoic Era. Once the Isthmus of Panama formed about three million years ago, however, anteaters expanded their range into Central America as part of the Great American Interchange.

Habitat
Anteater habitats include dry tropical forests, rainforests, grasslands, and savannas. The silky anteater (Cyclopes didactylus) is specialized to an arboreal environment, but the more opportunistic tamanduas find their food both on the ground and in trees, typically in dry forests near streams and lakes. The almost entirely terrestrial giant anteater (Myrmecophaga tridactyla) lives in savannas.

The two anteaters of the genus Tamandua, the southern (Tamandua tetradactyla) and the northern tamanduas (Tamandua mexicana), are much smaller than the giant anteater, and differ essentially from it in their habits, being mainly arboreal. They inhabit the dense primeval forests of South and Central America. The usual colour is yellowish-white, with a broad black lateral band, covering nearly the whole of the side of the body.

The silky anteater (Cyclopes didactylus) is a native of the hottest parts of South and Central America, and about the size of a cat, of a general yellowish color, and exclusively arboreal in its habits.

References

Pilosans
Anteaters
Mammals of Central America
Mammals of South America
Extant Miocene first appearances